Earl Alfred Boyea Jr. (born April 10, 1951) is an American prelate of the Roman Catholic Church. He has been serving as the bishop of the Diocese of Lansing in Michigan since 2008.  He previously served as an auxiliary bishop of the Archdiocese of Detroit in Michigan from 2002 to 2008.

Biography

Early life 
Earl Boyea was born on April 10, 1951, in Pontiac, Michigan, the eldest of the ten children of Earl and Helen Boyea. He was raised in Waterford, Michigan, and attended Our Lady of the Lakes School in Waterford until the eighth grade.  

In 1965, Boyea entered Sacred Heart Seminary High School and College in Detroit, obtaining his Bachelor of History degree. In 1973, he entered the Pontifical North American College and Pontifical Gregorian University in Rome.  Boyea graduated in 1976 from the Gregorian University with a Bachelor of Sacred Theology degree.  In 1977, he returned to Michigan to serve as a deacon at St. Benedict Parish in Pontiac.

Priesthood 
On May 20, 1978, Boyea was ordained to the priesthood for the Archdiocese of Detroit by Bishop Joseph Imesch. Boyea then served as associate pastor of St. Michael the Archangel Parish in Monroe, Michigan.  In 1979, Boyea returned to the Gregorian University, obtaining his Licentiate of Sacred Theology in 1980, with a thesis, Christology in Galatians. In 1980, Boyea became associate pastor of St. Timothy Parish in Trenton, Michigan. In 1984, he earned his Master of Arts degree in American history from Wayne State University in Detroit with a thesis entitled: "John Samuel Foley, Third Bishop of Detroit: His Ecclesiastical Conflicts in the Diocese of Detroit, 1888–1900". 

In 1986, Boyea was named temporary administrator of St. Christine Parish in Detroit. Boyea obtained his Doctor of Church History degree from Catholic University of America in Washington, D.C. in 1987.  In 1987, he was posted as a weekend assistant at St. Joseph Parish in Lake Orion, Michigan, then transferred in 1988 to Holy Family Parish in Novi, Michigan. Also in 1988, Boyea served as the chaplain of Camp Sancta Maria, a Catholic boys' summer camp in Gaylord, Michigan. In 1990, Boyea went to Sacred Heart Parish in Auburn Hills, Michigan.  He sat on the Archdiocesan Presbyteral Council (1990-91), and on the board of Madonna University in Livonia, Michigan (1994-2000).. From 1987 to 2000, Boyea taught church history and scripture at Sacred Heart Major Seminary, becoming dean of studies in 1990.

Boyea left Camp Sancta Maria and Sacred Heart Parish in 1999.  On January 18, 2000, he was elevated by the Vatican to monsignor  In 2001, Boyea became a weekend assistant at St. Mary Paris in the German Village district of Columbus, Ohio while serving as the rector-president and a professor at the Pontifical College Josephinum in Columbus. 

Boyea was editor of the North Central Association Self-Study Report in 1994, of the United States Catholic Conference Self-Study Report in 1995, of the Association of Theological Schools Self-Study Report in 1996, and of the National Conference of Catholic Bishops' Seminary Visitation Report in 1998.

Auxiliary Bishop of Detroit
On July 22, 2002, Boyea was appointed as an auxiliary bishop of the Archdiocese of Detroit and titular bishop of Siccenna by Pope John Paul II. On September 13, 2002, he received his episcopal consecration from Cardinal Adam Maida, with Archbishop Timothy P. Broglio and Bishop Thomas Joseph Tobin serving as co-consecrators. Boyea served as regional bishop for the south region of the archdiocese.  He then spent tours serving the northeast region.

Bishop of Lansing
On February 27, 2008, Pope Benedict XVI named Boyea the fifth bishop of the Diocese of Lansing, with his installation on April 29, 2008, Boyea serves 222,500 Catholics in the diocese.

Within the United States Conference of Catholic Bishops (USCCB), Boyea sits on the Committee on Clergy, Consecrated Life and Vocations, having formerly sat on the Committee on Boundaries of Dioceses and Provinces and on Priestly Formation and the Committee on Selection of Bishops. He also belongs to the Catholic Biblical Association, and the American Catholic Historical Association.

On September 27, 2019, the diocese released a list of 17 priests who were credibly accused of sexual abuse of minors or young adults.  Boyea made this statement:The primary intended audience of this list are victims of abuse: to encourage presently unknown victims to come forward; to help victims expose their abusers; and to assist victims in finding healing – it is also hoped that this information will assist all to ensure that such abuse never happens again.On October 17, 2019, the diocese released a special investigative report that said the diocese in 1990 had failed to investigate a sexual assault by a priest, Pat Egan, against a young man.  Boyea made this statement:I repeat publicly now what I have said privately and personally to the victim in question:  I am deeply sorry for the Diocese’s past failure and all should know that the allegation would have been handled differently today.

See also

 Catholic Church hierarchy
 Catholic Church in the United States
 Historical list of the Catholic bishops of the United States
 List of Catholic bishops of the United States
 Lists of patriarchs, archbishops, and bishops

References

External links
Diocese of Lansing
Reiz, Rose Mary (March 04, 2008) Bishop Earl Boyea coming at pivotal time for Catholic Diocese of Lansing The Flint Journal.

Episcopal succession

1951 births
Living people
People from Pontiac, Michigan
Roman Catholic bishops of Lansing
21st-century Roman Catholic bishops in the United States
Pontifical North American College alumni
Pontifical Gregorian University alumni
Catholic University of America alumni
Wayne State University alumni
Madonna University
Roman Catholic Archdiocese of Detroit
Sacred Heart Major Seminary faculty
People from Waterford, Michigan